Isl (or isl) is a common abbreviation for "island" or "islands".

ISL may also refer to:

Education and research
 Illinois Security Lab, a research laboratory at the University of Illinois at Urbana-Champaign
 Independent School League (disambiguation), independent high school athletic conferences in the United States
 Institute of State and Law, a Russian legal think tank affiliated with the Russian Academy of Sciences
 International School of Louisiana, a charter school system in the United States
 International School of Lusaka, an international school in Zambia
 International School of Luxembourg, a privately owned non-profit school in Luxembourg
 International School of Lyon, an international school in France

Languages
 Icelandic language (ISO 639-2 tag: ISL), a language spoken in Iceland
 Indian Sign Language also known as sign language of the deaf community in India
 International Sign Language, any of several international auxiliary languages
 Irish Sign Language, the sign language of Ireland
 Israeli Sign Language, the most commonly used sign language within Israel's deaf community
Italian Sign Language, sign language used for Italian deaf people

Sports
 Independent School League (Illinois), a group of nine Chicago-area preparatory schools
 Independent School League (New England), a group of 16 New England preparatory schools
 Independent School League (Washington, D.C. area), a group of 17 Washington, D.C. preparatory schools
 Interscholastic League of Honolulu, a group of Hawaiian private schools
 Indian Super League, a professional football-club league based in India
 Ice Hockey Superleague, a British-based ice hockey league that existed between 1996 and 2003
 Indonesia Super League, the top-tier competition for football clubs in Indonesia
 International Soccer League, a U.S. based soccer league which was formed in 1960 and collapsed in 1965
 International Sport and Leisure, a bankrupt Swiss sports marketing company that was closely affiliated with FIFA and the IOC
 Iranian Super League (disambiguation), the Iranian professional basketball, futsal or volleyball leagues
 Island Soccer League, a professional six-a-side association football league based in Bermuda
 International Swimming League, a professional swimming league with ten teams and nine rounds in different cities all over the world

Transport
 Island line (MTR), one of the rapid transit railway lines in Hong Kong
 Isleworth railway station, London, England (National Rail station code)
 Istanbul Atatürk Airport, a former major international airport serving Istanbul, Turkey now serves cargo flights

Other uses
 Iceland, a Nordic European island country
 In situ leach, a mining technique
 Independent Socialist League, a defunct Trotskyist group in the United States (originally called the "Workers Party")
 Independent State Legislature Doctrine, U.S. Constitution reading
 Integer set library (isl), a programming library for manipulating integer sets
 Inter-Switch Link (disambiguation), a specially configured connection between network equipment
 Cisco Inter-Switch Link, a proprietary Cisco VLAN trunking protocol
 Intercon Security, a security firm
 International Socialist Left (Germany), a Trotskyist group in Germany
 Irish Shipping Limited, an Irish state-owned deepsea shipping company formed during World War II
 i. s. L., "in the sense of Lyapunov" (in mathematical contexts), a reference to  Lyapunov stability 
 International Service Learning, a humanitarian NGO that offers volunteers practical experience in medical, education, and community enrichment programs